Svebølle Boldklub og Idrætsforening 2016, commonly known as Svebølle BI 2016 or SBI is a Danish association football club currently playing in the Series 1, the sixth tier of the Danish football league system and the second under the regional association, DBU Zealand. They play at Svebølle Stadion in Svebølle on Zealand, which has a capacity of 13,500.

External links
 Official site
 

Football clubs in Denmark
Association football clubs established in 2016
2016 establishments in Denmark